Sir Charles Hibbert Tupper  (August 3, 1855 – March 30, 1927) was a Canadian lawyer and politician.

Family, early career
Tupper was the second son of Sir Charles Tupper, a physician, leading Conservative politician, and Canadian diplomat. The elder Tupper served as premier of Nova Scotia, was a Father of Confederation, and served briefly as prime minister of Canada in 1896. The younger Tupper practised law in Halifax, Nova Scotia, after articling to learn the profession; at the time there was no formal legal education in Atlantic Canada. He formed a successful partnership with Wallace Graham, and the two invited the young Robert Borden, a future prime minister who was one year older than Tupper, to join them in the late 1870s. A decade later, Borden became the firm's senior partner after Graham was appointed a judge and Tupper entered politics.

Tupper's younger brother William Johnston Tupper also became a Conservative politician.

MP, Cabinet minister
He was elected as a Conservative MP in 1882. He was appointed Minister of Marine and Fisheries by Sir John A. Macdonald in 1888, and kept that position in subsequent Conservative cabinets until 1894, under PMs Sir John Abbott and Sir John Sparrow David Thompson.

He then became Minister of Justice in the government of Sir Mackenzie Bowell and attempted, unsuccessfully, to resolve the Manitoba Schools Question by drafting a bill to restore Separate School education for Catholics in Manitoba. Tupper resigned in January 1896 to protest Bowell's leadership, which had largely failed on this question, among others. He returned as Solicitor General of Canada in the short-lived government of his father, who became prime minister later in 1896, when Bowell stepped down. Tupper Sr. was defeated in the 1896 Canadian federal election, by Liberal Wilfrid Laurier, who became prime minister. Tupper remained an MP until his retirement from politics in 1904.

Knighted
In 1893, while minister of Marine and Fisheries, he was involved in the Bering Sea Arbitration between the United States and Canada as a representative of the British government, which at that time was responsible for Canadian foreign affairs. He was knighted in recognition for this service, which produced a successful outcome for Canada.

Moves to British Columbia
In 1897 he moved to Victoria, British Columbia, and then moved to Vancouver in 1898, but continued as the Member of Parliament for Pictou, Nova Scotia, where he was re-elected in 1900. From 1898 he practised law in Vancouver, where he served as a bencher of the Law Society of British Columbia. He represented Japanese-Canadians in a series of cases opposing discriminatory practices of the provincial government. In 1923, he was involved in the creation of the short-lived Provincial Party of British Columbia.

Family
In September 1879, Charles Hibbert Tupper married Janet McDonald, daughter of the Hon. James McDonald, Chief Justice of Nova Scotia, and his wife, Jane. The couple had four sons and three daughters. The couple lived in Parkside, Vancouver, B.C. Her sister married her brother-in-law, Mr. W. J. Tupper. Another sister married the Rev. L. H. Jordan, B.D., of Chicago.

Electoral history

References

External links
 
 
 

1855 births
1927 deaths
Canadian Knights Commander of the Order of St Michael and St George
Children of prime ministers of Canada
Conservative Party of Canada (1867–1942) MPs
Members of the House of Commons of Canada from Nova Scotia
Members of the King's Privy Council for Canada
Lawyers in Nova Scotia
People of New England Planter descent
People from Cumberland County, Nova Scotia
Lawyers in British Columbia
Younger sons of baronets
Solicitors General of Canada